Martin Lachkovics (born 25 January 1975 in Vienna) is an Austrian athlete and bobsledder. He represented Austria in athletics at two consecutive Olympic Games, in 1996 and 2000.

He has competed in bobsled since 2006. His best finish in the Bobsleigh World Cup was third twice in the two-man event (Calgary - November 2007, Cortina d'Ampezzo - January 2008).

Lachkovics' best finish at the FIBT World Championships was sixth in the two-man event at St. Moritz in 2007.

References
 
 

1975 births
Living people
Austrian male sprinters
Austrian male bobsledders
Athletes (track and field) at the 1996 Summer Olympics
Athletes (track and field) at the 2000 Summer Olympics
Olympic athletes of Austria